The Irish Naturalisation and Immigration Service is part of the civil service of the Republic of Ireland. It serves as an executive agency of the Department of Justice.

Overview 

The Irish Naturalisation and Immigration Service (INIS)  was established in 2005 in order to provide a ‘one stop shop’ in relation to asylum, immigration, citizenship and visas. INIS is responsible for administering the administrative functions of the Minister for Justice in relation to asylum, immigration (including visas) and citizenship matters. The INIS also facilitates a whole of government approach to immigration and asylum issues which enables a more efficient service to be provided in these areas. It also works with the Department of Enterprise, Trade and Employment on the issuing of work permits.

Structure 
The Service is structured around a number of key areas – asylum, visa, immigration and citizenship processing, asylum and immigration policy, repatriation, and reception and integration. The agency also maintains close contact with the Garda National Immigration Bureau in relation to many aspects of its work including, deportations and illegal immigration. Members of the Garda Síochána of Detective rank, also carrying the seal of Immigration Officers operate on a full-time basis within the head office in Burgh Quay. A Garda Immigration office is also maintained at all Airports and main ports and at all Garda District Headquarters outside the Dublin Region.

Previously the responsibilities were shared between the Department of Justice and the Department of Foreign Affairs, of the Civil service of the Republic of Ireland. It is located at 13/14 Burgh Quay, Dublin 2, Ireland.

References

External links
 

Government agencies of the Republic of Ireland
Immigration services
Immigration to the Republic of Ireland
Department of Justice (Ireland)